Julio Iglisias may refer to:

 Julio Iglesias Sr. (1915–2005), Spanish gynecologist
 Julio Iglesias (born 1943), Spanish singer, son of previous
 Julio Iglesias Jr. (born 1973), Spanish singer, host, actor and model, son of previous
 Julio José Iglesias Rouget (born 1972), Spanish former footballer, who played as a goalkeeper